This article comprises three sortable tables of major mountain peaks of Mexico.

The summit of a mountain or hill may be measured in three principal ways:
The topographic elevation of a summit measures the height on the summit above a geodetic sea level.  The first table below ranks the 40 highest major summits of México by elevation.
The topographic prominence of a summit is a measure of how high the summit rises above its surroundings.  The second table below ranks the 40 most prominent summits of México.
The topographic isolation (or radius of dominance) of a summit measures how far the summit lies from its nearest point of equal elevation.  The third table below ranks the 40 most isolated major summits of México.



Highest major summits

Of the 40 highest major summits of Mexico, three peaks exceed  elevation, eight peaks exceed , and 28 peaks exceed  elevation.

Of these 40 peaks, five are located in Jalisco, five in Coahuila, four in Oaxaca, six in Puebla, four in the state of Mexico, three in Chiapas, two in Nuevo León, two in Veracruz, two in Michoacán, two in Querétaro, two in Durango, two in Chihuahua, two in San Luis Potosí, and one each in Morelos, Tlaxcala, Mexico City, Colima, Guerrero, Guanajuato, Zacatecas, Baja California, Aguascalientes, Sinaloa, and Sonora. Volcán Tacaná lies on the international border between Chiapas and Guatemala, and nine other peaks lie on a state border.

Most prominent summits

Of the 40 most prominent summits of México, only Pico de Orizaba exceeds  of topographic prominence, Popocatépetl exceeds , five peaks exceed , and 26 peaks are ultra-prominent summits with at least  of topographic prominence.

Of these 40 peaks, five are located in Oaxaca, five in Baja California, four in Puebla, four in Jalisco, four in Nuevo León, four in Coahuila, three in Veracruz, three in México, three in Baja California Sur, two in Michoacán, two in Querétaro, and one each in Morelos, Guerrero, Tlaxcala, Guanajuato, Durango, Chiapas, and Distrito Federal.  Five peaks lie on a state border.

Most isolated major summits

Of the 40 most isolated major summits of México, only Pico de Orizaba exceeds  of topographic isolation.  Four peaks exceed , 14 peaks exceed , and 33 peaks exceed  of topographic isolation.

Of these 40 peaks, five are located in Coahuila, four in Baja California, four in Oaxaca, three in Puebla, three in Jalisco, three in Baja California Sur, two in Veracruz, two in Nuevo León, two in Chihuahua, two in Chiapas, two in México, two in Michoacán, two in Querétaro, and one each in Colima, Durango, Guerrero, Sonora, Morelos, Guanajuato, San Luis Potosí, Zacatecas, Tlaxcala, and Nayarit.  Six peaks lie on a state border.

Gallery

See also

List of mountain peaks of North America
List of mountain peaks of Greenland
List of mountain peaks of Canada
List of mountain peaks of the Rocky Mountains
List of mountain peaks of the United States

List of the ultra-prominent summits of México
List of extreme summits of México
List of mountain peaks of Central America
List of mountain peaks of the Caribbean
Mexico
Geography of Mexico
:Category:Mountains of Mexico
commons:Category:Mountains of Mexico
Physical geography
Topography
Topographic elevation
Topographic prominence
Topographic isolation

Notes

References

External links

Instituto Nacional de Estadística, Geografía e Informática (INEGI)
Sistemas Nacionales Estadístico y de Información Geográfica (SNEIG)
Bivouac.com
Peakbagger.com
Peaklist.org
Peakware.com
Summitpost.org

 
 
Geography of Mexico
Mexico, List Of Mountain Peaks Of
Mexico, List Of Mountain Peaks Of
Mexico, List Of Mountain Peaks Of